Djavan de Lima Araujo (born 5 April 1990 in Feira de Santana), commonly known as Dija Baiano, is a Brazilian professional footballer for Al-Bukiryah.

He has represented Brasiliense, Ipatinga, Volta Redonda, Macaé, Boavista and Treze in national league competitions, and was part of the Volta Redonda team which won 2016 Campeonato Brasileiro Série D.

He spent time abroad in Qatar with Al-Mesaimeer in 2013–14, and in Saudi Arabia with Al-Orobah in 2018.

Honoiurs 
Brasiliense
 Campeonato Brasiliense: 2011

Volta Redonda
 Campeonato Brasileiro Série D: 2016

References

External links

1990 births
Living people
Brazilian footballers
People from Feira de Santana
Brazilian expatriate footballers
Association football forwards
Expatriate footballers in Qatar
Campeonato Brasileiro Série B players
Campeonato Brasileiro Série C players
Campeonato Brasileiro Série D players
Associação Ferroviária de Esportes players
Sociedade Esportiva do Gama players
Brasiliense Futebol Clube players
Guaratinguetá Futebol players
Ipatinga Futebol Clube players
Associação Atlética Caldense players
Mesaimeer SC players
Ituano FC players
Volta Redonda FC players
Macaé Esporte Futebol Clube players
América Futebol Clube (RN) players
Qatari Second Division players
Al-Orobah FC players
Boavista Sport Club players
Treze Futebol Clube players
Uberlândia Esporte Clube players
Al-Bukayriyah FC players
Saudi First Division League players
Saudi Second Division players
Brazilian expatriate sportspeople in Saudi Arabia
Expatriate footballers in Saudi Arabia
Sportspeople from Bahia